Passengers Alighting from Ferry Brighton at Manly was the first film shot and screened in Australia.

Marius Sestier made a film of passengers alighting from the paddle steamer ferry Brighton at Manly Wharf.

In September 1896, Sestier and Henry Walter Barnett opened Australia's first cinema, the Salon Lumière in Pitt Street, Sydney. It was at this cinema the film was first shown on the 27th October 1896 with the promise of more to come.

Sestier, together with Henry Walter Barnett, made approximately 19 films in Sydney and Melbourne between October and November 1896, these being the very first films recorded in Australia.

There is no known surviving copy of the film.

References

External links

1890s Australian films
1896 films
Australian silent short films
Australian black-and-white films
1896 short films
Films set on ships
Films shot in Sydney